RFK Majdanpek is a defunct football club based in Majdanpek, Serbia.

History
The club made its Yugoslav Second League debut in 1977. They spent three seasons in Group East, before suffering relegation in 1980. The club played in the second tier for the second time between 1986 and 1988.

Honours
Bor District League (Tier 5)
 2015–16

Notable players
This is a list of players who have played at full international level.
  Nenad Grozdić
  Vladan Radača
  Josip Zemko
For a list of all FK Majdanpek players with a Wikipedia article, see :Category:FK Majdanpek players.

References

External links
 Club page at Srbijasport

1934 establishments in Serbia
Association football clubs established in 1934
Football clubs in Yugoslavia
Defunct football clubs in Serbia
Mining association football clubs in Serbia